The Marshall Hickmon Homestead is a historic house on Arkansas Highway 87 in Bradford, Arkansas.  It is a -story wood-frame structure, clad in stucco, with a jerkin-headed side-gable roof and a concrete foundation.  Most of its front facade is sheltered by a gabled porch, supported by sloping square columns finished in shingles and set on concrete piers.  The house was built in 1933, and is a high quality local example of Craftsman architecture.

The house was listed on the National Register of Historic Places in 1992.

See also
National Register of Historic Places listings in White County, Arkansas

References

Houses on the National Register of Historic Places in Arkansas
National Register of Historic Places in White County, Arkansas
Houses completed in 1933
Houses in White County, Arkansas
1933 establishments in Arkansas
American Craftsman architecture in Arkansas
Bungalow architecture in Arkansas